James Wilkes-Green (born 19 October 1995) is a Guernsey cricketer.

Most recently, Wilkes-Green represented Durham MCCU. Previously, he represented Sussex County Cricket Club between under-14 and under-17 and at the Emerging Player and Academy levels. He was selected on two Academy tours to Cape Town and one Emerging Player tour to Abu Dhabi.

Wilkes-Green was named in Guernsey's squad for the 2015 ICC World Cricket League Division Six tournament in England, playing in two matches. In addition, he represented Guernsey in the under-19 ICC Europe World Cup Qualifier in 2013, during which he averaged in excess of 50 with the bat, including a match-winning 59* against the Netherlands. 

Wilkes-Green was educated at Elizabeth College, Guernsey and then Hurstpierpoint College. He studied Geography at Durham University (Hatfield College), where he played cricket for Durham MCCU.

References

External links
 

1995 births
Living people
Guernsey cricketers
Place of birth missing (living people)
Durham MCCU cricketers
Alumni of Hatfield College, Durham
People educated at Elizabeth College, Guernsey
People educated at Hurstpierpoint College